Thanatiphoro Anthologio ("Deadly Anthology" in Greek) is a compilation album spanning the entire career of the Greek extreme metal band Rotting Christ. The album was released by Century Media on November 6, 2007, and features two discs of fan favorites, demo rarities, archived photos, and an in depth article of praise from AnneMarie Bowman of Metal Maniacs magazine.

Track listing 

Rotting Christ albums
2007 greatest hits albums